Scinto is an Italian surname. Notable people with the surname include:

 Luca Scinto (born 1968), Italian cyclist
 Robert D. Scinto (born 1947), American real estate developer and convicted felon
 Robert Scinto (born 1946), American director

Italian-language surnames